Bob Scott (October 4, 1928 in Watsonville, California – July 5, 1954 in Darlington, South Carolina) was an American racecar driver. Scott died in a crash during a Champ Car race at Darlington Raceway.

Indy 500 results

World Championship career summary
The Indianapolis 500 was part of the FIA World Championship from 1950 through 1960. Drivers competing at Indy during those years were credited with World Championship points and participation. Bob Scott participated in 3 World Championship races but scored no World Championship points.

1928 births
1954 deaths
American racing drivers
Indianapolis 500 drivers
People from Watsonville, California
Racing drivers from California
Racing drivers who died while racing
Sports deaths in South Carolina